These are the Billboard magazine R&B singles chart number one hits of 1997.

Chart history

Chart comparisons
Three songs reached number-one on the Billboard Hot 100/pop and the Hot Rap Singles charts: "Can't Nobody Hold Me Down", "Hypnotize" and "I'll Be Missing You".
Three songs reached number-one on the Rhythmic chart: "Don't Let Go (Love)", "I'll Be Missing You" and "You Make Me Wanna..."

See also
1997 in music
List of number-one R&B hits (United States)
List of number-one R&B albums of 1997 (U.S.)

References

1997
1997 record charts
1997 in American music